Located in the Valley of the Kings, Tomb KV12 is an unusual tomb, used originally in the Eighteenth Dynasty of Ancient Egypt, and then again in the Nineteenth and Twentieth Dynasties. It was probably used for multiple burials of royal family members, rather like KV5.

The builders of KV9 broke unintentionally into KV12 whilst excavating that tomb. During the modern excavation of KV9, rumors of the second tomb had circulated throughout the camp, however, leading scientists dismissed the idea and continued on. The tomb diggers broke through the ground into the tomb only to find the remains of multiple family members in the KV12. Researchers are still working on identifying the family members and collecting the other artifacts in the tomb.

References
 Reeves, N & Wilkinson, R.H. The Complete Valley of the Kings, 1996, Thames and Hudson, London.
 Siliotti, A. Guide to the Valley of the Kings and to the Theban Necropolises and Temples, 1996, A.A. Gaddis, Cairo.

External links
 Theban Mapping Project: KV12 - Includes description, images, and plans of the tomb.
Images showing KV12 and KV9

Valley of the Kings